The Pinehurst Historic District in Tuscaloosa, Alabama is a residential historic district which was listed on the National Register of Historic Places in 1986. The listing included 17 contributing buildings and nine non-contributing ones.

It was developed as Tuscaloosa's first garden landscaped residential area, during 1908 to 1935.  It was Tuscaloosa's first affluent housing development and includes homes designed by local architects C.W. Ayers and Harry Harring, and one by Birmingham architect William Welton.  Features of the garden landscaped residential suburb movement exemplified here include: "a landscape design that relates to the
topography, natural plantings, curvilinear streets (represented here by a cul-de-sac), lack of fences, and barriers to through traffic.

It includes 215 and 305 Seventeenth Ave., 1--28 Pinehurst Dr., and 6--9 N. Pinehurst Dr. in Tuscaloosa.

The contributing buildings are:
Fitts House (1915), 1 Pinehurst Dr.; two-story brick Prairie School home of lumberman and banker William F. Fitts
Foster House (1919), 2 Pinehurst Dr.; two-story Tudor Revival
Alston House (1916), 3 Pinehurst Dr.; two-story stone home of Alston family, local bankers
Foster House (1927), 5 Pinehurst Dr.; two-story stucco, gable roofed house with cross gable projecting end bay
Blair House (1910), 7 Pinehurst Dr.; two-story stone and stucco, gable roof, with one-story pedimented portico, home of Frank Blair, an "original Pinehurst financier".
Kay House (1909), 9 Pinehurst Dr.; two-story brick home of Edgar Kay, Dean of School of Engineering, University of Alabama
15 Pinehurst Dr. (1910); two-story stone house with Prairie School elements and 1967 addition, home of Thoe Klitske, head of the University's art department
16 Pinehurst Dr. (1915); two story stucco house
17 Pinehurst Dr. (1922); designed by architect William L. Welton, two-story English bond brick house, with one-story portico over a recessed fanlighted entry.
Bingham House (1919), 18 Pinehurst Dr.; Tudor Revival
19 Pinehurst Dr. (1918); designed by  C. M. Ayres, Jr., two-story brick and frame house with English Cottage style influence.
Goldstein House (1933), 24 Pinehurst Dr.;  Spanish Revival house designed by architect C. M. Ayres, Jr.
26 Pinehurst Dr. (1922); two-story frame and stucco house with cross gable dormers over end bays.
25 Pinehurst Dr. (c.1925); English Cottage, one-story brick house with cross gable projecting end bay, arched hood over entry.
305 17th Ave. (1926); two-story brick house with one-story cross gable porch across front facade of center block
27 Pinehurst (1932); Tudor Revival brick and stucco house
28 Pinehurst (1908); Shingle Style two-story wood shingle duplex, home of owner of Pizitz Department stores.

References

National Register of Historic Places in Tuscaloosa County, Alabama
Historic districts on the National Register of Historic Places in Alabama
Colonial Revival architecture in Alabama
Tudor Revival architecture in the United States
Prairie School architecture
Buildings and structures completed in 1908